Hercúlaas Johannes Liebenberg (born 16 May 1986) is a South African rugby union footballer. His regular playing position is hooker.

Career

References

1986 births
Living people
People from Tsantsabane Local Municipality
Afrikaner people
South African people of German descent
South African rugby union players
Rugby union hookers
Cheetahs (rugby union) players
Free State Cheetahs players
Griffons (rugby union) players
University of the Free State alumni
Alumni of Grey College, Bloemfontein
Rugby union players from the Northern Cape